George Corbett is the name of:

George Corbett (American football) (1908–1990), American football running back for the Chicago Bears
George Corbett (footballer) (1925–1999), English professional footballer